Julien Fontanes, magistrat is a French police television series. It has been distributed since 1980 on TF1 (France),  the show remains active as of 1989.

Plot
This series features Julien Fontanes, judge by the Ministry of Justice to review the files clemency.

Cast

Main characters
 Jacques Morel as Judge Julien Fontanes
 André Falcon as The Cardonnois
 Jean-Claude Calon as Patrick
 Françoise Fleury as Hélène

Recurring characters
 Jacques Lalande as Taybosc
 Antoinette Moya as Marthe
 Jacques Alric as Robert
 Jacqueline Doyen as Sophie Legros
 Victor Garrivier as Commissioner Pagnoz
 Jean-Claude Narcy as TV Host
 Odette Laure as Mémaine
 Paul Bisciglia as Albert Piot
 Georges Werler as Doctor Combes
 Michel Tugot-Doris as Bordier
 Corinne Lahaye as Isabelle
 Jean-Marie Bernicat as Brulier
 Yves Arcanel as The Houen
 Philippe Moreau as Blériot

Guest

 Bernard Le Coq as Judge Gallie
 Françoise Brion as Madame The Cardonnois
 Serge Sauvion as René Leych
 André Valardy as Robert
 Max Doria as Ludovic
 Bruno Masure as Journalist
 Marie-Laure Augry as Journalist
 Thierry Beccaro as Journalist
 Jean-Pierre Darras as M. Carré
 Jean-Michel Dupuis as Jacky Balkowiacz / Nono
 Jacques Dynam as Léon Boueix
 Maurice Chevit as Banyuls
 Marc Chapiteau as Valério
 Odile Versois as Inge Wolfrum 
 Gérard Darrieu as Émile Digoin
 Jacques Balutin as Michel Courban
 Hugues Quester as Judge Maxime Rubod
 François Cluzet as Bob Mourèze
 Catherine Sauvage as Clarisse Salvignat
 Myriam Boyer as Norma Lagneau
 Jean Martinelli as Alain Lavernat
 Yves Barsacq as Louis Ferrato
 Raymond Gérôme as Jean-Claude Lorentzen
 Julien Bertheau as Paul Dissiedky
 Sophie Renoir as Gina
 Souad Amidou as Mina
 Pierre Maguelon as André
 Daniel Russo as Antoine Gissac
 France Anglade as Liliane
 Gabriel Cattand as René de Senover
 Michel Creton as Jacques Fouleix
 Christian Barbier as Jeff Stenay
 Jacques François as Quinzac
 Annick Alane as Zoutie
 Ronny Coutteure as Albert
 Dora Doll as Madeleine Mignot
 Marie Déa as Irma Dissiesky
 Michel Beaune as Bonsmoulins
 Pierre Doris as René Kembs
 Catherine Jacob as Dany
 Paulette Dubost as Mémée Plantini
 Jean Benguigui as Didier Lamiral
 François Dyrek as Marcellin
 Michel Berto as Fedry
 Roland Blanche as Beno
 Gabriel Jabbour as Vestria
 Nathalie Roussel as Rose
 Marion Game as Sonia
 Jean-Pierre Bernard as Dany Mandina 
 Henry Djanik as Carbuccia  
 Jean Martin as The prefect
 Philippe Nahon as The cop
 Benoît Allemane as Jacques Nohant
 Philippe Laudenbach as Father Marc Bolleret
 Liliane Rovère as Rolande Gripport
 Dominique Pinon

Directors
 Guy Lefranc (6 Episodes)
 François Dupont-Midi (4 Episodes)
 Jean-Pierre Decourt, Daniel Moosmann & André Farwagi (2 Episodes)
 Bernard Toublanc-Michel, Patrick Jamain, Jean Pignol, Serge Friedman & Michel Berny (1 Episode)

See also
 List of French television series

External links

1980 French television series debuts
French police procedural television series
TF1 original programming